MacKenzie Lea Porter (born January 29, 1990) is a Canadian country singer, songwriter, and actress. She has released one self-titled album and achieved four Canada Country number ones with "About You", "These Days", "Seeing Other People", and "Pickup". She is featured on Dustin Lynch's number one Country Airplay hit "Thinking 'Bout You". As an actor she is best known for her leading role as a future-sent medic in the television series Travelers.

Early life
MacKenzie Porter was raised on a cattle and bison ranch near Medicine Hat, Alberta. She began studying piano, violin, and voice at age four. While growing up she toured in a family band with her brother, 2004 Canadian Idol winner Kalan Porter. Their grandfather Bob Porter was Member of Parliament for Medicine Hat from 1988 to 1993.

Film and TV career
Porter has appeared in numerous films and television productions, including Dinosapien (2007), Hell on Wheels, and Travelers (2016). She earned a Best Actress in Alberta award for her role in the TV movie The Other Woman. She was also named as one of the Top 11 Hottest Vancouver Actors to Watch for in 2011 by BC Living magazine.

Music career

Early career
After moving to Vancouver to pursue acting, Porter teamed up with musician and actor Andrew Jenkins to form the band The Black Boots. In 2010, she launched a solo career. Porter was the winner of the 2011 Nashville North Star competition. She has opened for Kenny Chesney, Doc Walker, and Trooper among others, and has performed for Prime Minister Stephen Harper and Gene Simmons.

In October 2012, Porter released her debut single, "I Wish I'd Known". Her second single, "Never Gonna Let You", was co-written and produced by Carolyn Dawn Johnson. Porter was chosen as one of six acts for the inaugural Canadian Country Music Association Discovery Program in 2013. She was also nominated for the Rising Star Award at the 2013 Canadian Country Music Association Awards. Her debut album was released on July 15, 2014. She is featured on the song "Circles" on Chris Lane's album Girl Problems in 2016.

2018–present: Big Loud Records, Drinkin' Songs, five number ones
In 2018, Porter signed with Nashville-based Big Loud and became their first Canadian artist. She released the single "About You", co-written by Hardy. The song would hit number one on Canada Country. Porter is featured on the Dallas Smith song "Friends Don't Let Friends Drink Alone" with Dean Brody.

In March 2019, Porter released the single "These Days", which charted on Canadian country, pop, and adult hits charts as well as on the US Hot Country Songs and Country Airplay charts. It also reached number one on Canada Country, making Porter the first Canadian woman to land back-to-back Number Ones since Shania Twain. She then opened for Dallas Smith and Dean Brody on their co-headlining cross-Canada Friends Don't Let Friends Tour Alone Tour. In February 2020, Porter released "Seeing Other People" which would become her third consecutive number one, making her the first woman (Canadian or American) to land three consecutive Number Ones on Canadian country radio since Twain.

Porter's EP Drinkin' Songs: The Collection was released in November 2020. The EP was her debut American release and included her three chart-toppers in addition to her top five hit "Drinkin' Songs". It received a nomination for Country Album of the Year at the 2021 Juno Awards. In March 2021, she featured on the Dustin Lynch single "Thinking 'Bout You", and then joined Canadian pop artist Virginia to Vegas on the single "This Sucks." in September 2021. She released the song "Pickup" later that year; it became a single in early 2022. "Thinking 'Bout You" spent six weeks atop the Country Airplay chart, marking Porter's first number one in the U.S., and spent a record-breaking 28 weeks in the top ten. Meanwhile, "Pickup" would go on to reach number one on Canada Country, and achieve gold-certification. Later that year, she joined fellow Canadian country artist Dallas Smith on the single "One Too".

In 2023, she participated in an all-star recording of Serena Ryder's single "What I Wouldn't Do", which was released as a charity single to benefit Kids Help Phone's Feel Out Loud campaign for youth mental health.

Personal life
In 2014 Porter and actor/singer/songwriter Jake Etheridge began dating. She and Etheridge were engaged in mid-/late May or early June 2019 and they married in July 2020.

Etheridge appeared in the 2019 music video for Porter’s 2018 song "About You".

Filmography

Discography

Studio albums

Extended plays

Singles

As lead artist

As featured artist

Music videos

Awards and nominations

References

External links

 
 

1990 births
Living people
21st-century Canadian actresses
21st-century Canadian violinists and fiddlers
21st-century Canadian women singers
Actresses from Alberta
Big Loud artists
Canadian child actresses
Canadian country fiddlers
Canadian film actresses
Canadian television actresses
Canadian voice actresses
Canadian women country singers
Canadian women pianists
Canadian women singer-songwriters
Canadian women violinists and fiddlers
Musicians from Alberta
People from Medicine Hat
21st-century women pianists